The Shetland Islands Council is the local authority for Shetland, Scotland. It was established by the Local Government (Scotland) Act 1973 and is the successor to the former Lerwick Town Council and Zetland County Council. This council was established in 1975 and was largely unaffected by the Scottish local government changes of the mid-1990s.

It provides services in the areas of Environmental Health, Roads, Social Work, Community Development, Organisational Development, Economic Development, Building Standards, Trading Standards, Housing, Waste, Education, Burial Grounds, Port and Harbours and others. The council is allowed to collect Council Tax. The Fire Service is part of the Highlands and Islands division of the Scottish Fire and Rescue Service.

In 2011, structural reforms saw the creation of the Political Leader position, with the Convenor becoming a civic leadership post.

Composition

As of 2022 the council has the following councillors:

Leaders

Political Leaders

Convenors

See also
 Constitutional status of Orkney, Shetland and the Western Isles
 Lerwick Declaration

Notes

References

External links
 Shetland Islands Council Website

Council
Lerwick
1975 establishments in Scotland
Local authorities of Scotland
Organisations based in Shetland